Vacuum catastrophe can mean:
 the cosmological constant problem in cosmology
 the divergence in the calculation of vacuum energy in quantum field theory
 vacuum instability in quantum field theory

See also 
 Quantum field theory
 Renormalization
 Vacuum energy